There are seven verb paradigms or speech levels in Korean, and each level has its own unique set of verb endings which are used to indicate the level of formality of a situation. Unlike honorifics – which are used to show respect towards someone mentioned in a sentence – speech levels are used to show respect towards a speaker's or writer's audience, or reflect the formality or informality of the situation.  They represent a system of honorifics in the linguistic use of the term as a grammar system, distinct from honorific titles.

The names of the seven levels are derived from the non-honorific imperative form of the verb hada (하다; "to do") in each level, plus the suffix che (체), which means "style". Each Korean speech level can be combined with honorific or non-honorific noun and verb forms. Taken together, there are 14 combinations.

Some of these speech levels are disappearing from the majority Korean speech . Hasoseo-che  is used now mainly in movies or dramas set in Joseon era,  and in religious speech. Hage-che is limited to modern male speech. Whilst Hao-che is found more commonly in the Jeolla dialect and Pyongan standard dialect.

Higher levels

Hasoseo-che 

Very formally polite Traditionally used when addressing a king, queen, or high official.

 
When the infix op / saop , jaop (옵; after a vowel / 사옵 , 자옵; after a consonant) or sap / jap (삽 / 잡) or sao / jao (사오 / 자오) is inserted, the politeness level also becomes very high. hanaida (하나이다) becomes haomnaida (하옵나이다; non-honorific present declarative very formally very polite), hasinaida (하시나이다) becomes hasiomnaida (하시옵나이다; honorific present declarative very formally very polite). The imperative form hasoseo (하소서) also becomes haopsoseo (하옵소서; non-honorific imperative very formally very polite) and hasiopsoseo (하시옵소서; honorific imperative very formally very polite). It is used now:

 historical dramas 
 religious text such as the Bible, Buddhist scriptures etc.
 address royalty

Hasipsio-che 

Formally polite This conversational style is generally called either the "formal" or the "formal polite". Another name for this is hapsyo-che or 합쇼체  This is a common style of speaking. A conversation with a stranger will generally start out in this style and gradually fade into more and more frequent haeyo-che. It is used 
 between strangers at the start of a conversation
 among colleagues in more formal settings; example work meetings
 by TV announcers 
 to customers 
 in certain fixed expressions like 만나서 반갑습니다 mannaseo bangapseumnida "Pleased to meet you"

Middle levels
The middle levels are used when there is some conflict or uncertainty about the social status of one or both participants in a conversation. The hage-che and hao-che are being replaced by or merging with haeyo-che.

Haeyo-che 

Casually polite This speech style is called the "polite" style in English. Like the 해체 Hae-che, it exhibits no inflection for most expected forms. Unlike other speech styles, basic conjugations for the declarative, interrogative and imperative forms are identical, depending on intonation and context or other additional suffixes. Most Korean phrasebooks for foreigners follow this speech style due to its simplicity and proper politeness. Second person pronouns are generally omitted in the polite speech styles. (See Korean pronouns.) It is used:
 In Korean phrasebooks for foreigners.
 Between strangers, especially those older or of equal age.
 Between colleagues
 By younger speakers as a less old-fashioned alternative to the hao-che.
 By men and women in Seoul as a less formal alternative to the hasipsio-che.

Hao-che 

Formally neither polite nor impolite
This conversational style is called the "semi-formal," "middle," "formal lateral," or "authoritarian" style in English. In Seoul, the 쇼 -syo ending is frequently pronounced 수 su. It is similar to the 하십시오체 Hasipsio-che, but does not lower oneself to show humility. It basically implies "My status is as high as you so I won't be humble, but I still respect your status and don't want to make you feel offended" so it's still supposed to be polite yet never willing to lower one's head to please the listener. (e.g. In the medieval times, if two kings from different countries have a meeting, they both would use this speech style. A king can use this speech style to his courtiers to show a minimum level of courtesy, and the courtiers will think the king is using a refined language.) It was originally a refined, poetic style that people resorted to in ambiguous social situations. Until the end of the nineteenth century, it was used widely in the ways the polite style is used now; but with the emergence of the polite style, the range of the semiformal style narrowed, and it became a style used only with inferiors. Further, due to its over-use by authority figures during Korea's period of dictatorship, it became associated with power and bureaucracy and gained a negative connotation. Consequently, this style has almost completely fallen out of use in modern South Korea, and the generation of Koreans who came of age after democratization also conspicuously avoid using it. It is used:
 Occasionally among the older generation, by civil servants, police officers, middle management, middle-aged people, and other people of intermediate social rank who have temporary authority over what would normally be considered their superiors
 Used in written language such as signs and public notices, in which case the imperative form is used.
 In historical dramas, where it gives the dialogue a more old-fashioned sound.
 In the spoken form of certain dialects, such as the Hamgyŏng dialect.

Hage-che 

Neither formal nor casual, neither polite nor impolite This conversational style is called the "familiar." It is intermediate in politeness between  haeyo-che and hae-che. It is not used to address children, and is never used to address blood relatives. It is used only:
 By some older people when addressing younger people or especially in-laws in a friendly manner.
 Used for those under one's authority: by professors toward their students, by bosses toward their employees etc.
 Between adult male friends, occasionally.
 In novels

Lower levels
The hae-che and haera-che styles are frequently mixed together in the same conversation, so much so that it can be hard to tell what verb endings belong to which style. 
Endings that may be used in either style are:
Question: -니?/-냐?/-느냐?
Proposition: -자. (this is roughly equivalent to "let's" in English)
Casual statement: -지. (this is roughly equivalent to "I suppose")
Casual question: -지?. (this is roughly equivalent to "I wonder if" in English)
Exclamation: -구나! -다!

Haera-che 

Formally impolite
This conversational style is generally called the "plain" style. In writing and quoting, the plain style is the equivalent of the third person. Any other written style would feel like a first-person account (that is, anything else would seem to be told in the main character's own voice). It is used:
 To close friends or relatives of similar age, and by adults to children.
 In impersonal writing (books, newspapers, and magazines) and indirect quotations ("She said that...").
 In grammar books, to give examples.
 In some exclamations.

Hae-che 

Casually impolite
This conversational style is called the "intimate" in English. Like the 해요체 Haeyo-che, it exhibits no inflection for most expected forms. Basic conjugations for the declarative, interrogative and imperative forms are identical, depending on intonation and context or other additional suffixes. It is used: 
 Between close friends and relatives.
 When talking to children.

Endings

Formal Speech

Hasoseo-che 
Raises the addressee very highly.

Hasipsio-che 
Raises the addressee highly.

Hao-che 
Raises the addressee moderately.

Hage-che 
Lowers the addressee moderately.

Haera-che 
Lowers the addressee.

Informal Speech

Haeyo-che 
Raises the addressee moderately.

Hae-che 
Lowers the addressee or does not raise the addressee.

See also
 Korean honorifics
 Korean pronouns

References 

 문체법 , (국어국문학자료사전, 1998, 한국사전연구사).

Korean language

de:Koreanische Sprache#Honorativsystem